Miklajung Rural Municipality may refer to:
Miklajung Rural Municipality, Morang
Miklajung Rural Municipality, Panchthar